Brian Rossiter Crozier (4 August 1918, in Shire of Cloncurry, Queensland – 4 August 2012) was a historian, propagandist and journalist. He was also one of the central staff members of a secret propaganda department belonging to the UK Foreign Office, known as the Information Research Department (IRD) which republished and supported much of his work, and used his position to insert propaganda articles within British publications.

Early life 
Crozier was born in a small village in Australia, where his father worked as mining engineer. In 1923 his family moved to France. In 1930, it moved to England, where he received a scholarship to study piano and composition at the Trinity College of Music in London. Early in life he believed in communism, as a reaction to the Great Depression and to Adolf Hitler, but he later changed his philosophy and worked to combat communism.

Career 
Crozier eventually became interested in journalism and pursued a career that led him to become a foreign correspondent for Reuters, a columnist for The Economist, a reporter for the BBC and, during a brief return to Australia, a writer for Sydney Morning Herald.

Crozier worked as the director of Forum World Features, set up in 1966 by the Congress for Cultural Freedom, which had ties to the American Central Intelligence Agency (CIA). While editing the Economists "insider" news sheet Foreign Report, Crozier, as he later recorded in his memoirs, kept some of the best stories that reached him for the CIA. He stated in 1975 that Forum World Features had broken all ties to the CIA when he became its director in the 1960s.

In 1970, Crozier founded the Institute for the Study of Conflict, based in London, to study insurgencies and terrorism. He presided over it for most of the 1970s. According to a profile written by David Rees in 1985 for the American fortnightly National Review "the Institute... was the first private think-tank devoted to the study of terrorism and subversion". Under his direction (he left in 1979) the institute specialised in the study of the "peacetime" strategy of the Soviet Union. Its analyses, including the Annual of Power and Conflict, which it published for ten years, have been used in war colleges throughout the West.

For many years, Crozier wrote a regular column, "The Protracted Conflict", in the National Review. Joseph D'Agostino of Human Events stated, "Crozier has another distinction: in 1988 he appeared in the Guinness Book of World Records for having interviewed the most heads of state or government, 58 in all".

Crozier provided advice to the British Secret Intelligence Service, to the Information Research Department (IRD) of the British Foreign Office, and to the CIA. Lecturing to Britain's staff college for army officers during the early 1970s, when the Labour Party was in power under Harold Wilson, Crozier stated if the government went "too far", it was the armed forces' duty to intervene (he claimed that he was enthusiastically applauded). In 1982, it was revealed from the papers of a former Bavarian state security chief, Hans Langemann, that Crozier was an attendant of Le Cercle and headed a secret international group that tried to influence the West German federal election of 1980 by using secret-service connections and cover-up financial transactions to make Franz Josef Strauß Chancellor of the Federal Republic of Germany.

Crozier was a co-founder of the group The 61, an organisation that wanted to counter Soviet communist propaganda.

HarperCollins published Crozier's autobiography, Free Agent: The Unseen War 1941–1991, in 1993, which was revised and corrected in paperback edition in 1994.

Crozier was a Distinguished Visiting Fellow on War, Revolution, and Peace of the Hoover Institution. He was also a member of the international advisory council of the Victims of Communism Memorial Foundation. In 1985, he signed a petition in support for the far-right paramilitary Contras (Nicaragua).

 Personal life 
Crozier was married twice. He had three daughters (Kathryn-Anne, Isobel and Caroline) and a son (Michael).

He died on 4 August 2012 after a long illness at 94.

Selected works

Books
The Rebels: A Study of Postwar Insurrections. Boston: Beacon Press (1960). .
The Morning After: A Study of Independence. London: Methuen (1963). .
 South East Asia in Turmoil. London: Penguin (1965). .
 The Struggle for the Third World. Chester Springs, Penn.: Dufour Editions (1966). .
Franco: A Biographical History. Boston: Little, Brown (1967). .
 Masters of Power. Boston: Little, Brown (1969). .
 Since Stalin: An Assessment of Communist Power. New York: Coward-McCann (1970). .
De Gaulle. New York: Charles Scribner's Sons (1973). .
A Theory of Conflict. New York: Charles Scribner's Sons (1974). .
 The Man Who Lost China: The First Full Biography of Chiang Kai-shek. New York: Charles Scribner's Sons (1976). .
 Strategy of Survival. London: Temple Smith (1978). .
 This War Called Peace, with Drew Middleton and Jeremy Murray-Brown. Universe Books (1985). .
 The Gorbachev Phenomenon: Peace and the Secret War. Great Britain: Claridge Press (1990). .
Free Agent: The Unseen War, 1941-1991. London: HarperCollins (1993). .
 The KGB Lawsuits. Great Britain: Claridge Press (1995). .
The Rise and Fall of the Soviet Empire. Rocklin, Calif.: Forum, with National Review (1999). .
 The Other Brian Croziers. Great Britain: Claridge Press (2002). .
 Political Victory: The Elusive Prize of Military Wars. New Jersey: Transaction Publishers (2005). .

Book contributions
 "South-East Asia" (Chapter 6). In: The Cold War: A Reappraisal, by Evan Luard. New York: Praeger (1964). .
"Der Spiegel: Confirmation from the East." In: Counter Culture, vol. 2, by Sir James Goldsmith (1993), pp. 99–105.

Articles
 "The Diem Regime in Southern Vietnam." Far Eastern Survey, vol. 24, no. 4 (Apr. 1955), pp. 49–56. .
 "The International Situation in Indochina." Pacific Affairs, vol. 29, no. 4 (Dec. 1956), pp. 309–323. .
 "France and Algeria," with Gerard Mansell. International Affairs, bol. 36, no. 3 (July 1960), pp. 310–321. . A discussion at Chatham House, March 8, 1960.
 "Peking and the Laotian Crisis: An Interim Appraisal." China Quarterly, no. 7 (Jul./Sep. 1961), pp. 128–137. .
 "Indonesia: Retrospect and Prospect." World Today, vol. 18, no. 7 (July 1962), pp. 295–304. .
 "Peking and the Laotian Crisis: A Further Appraisal." China Quarterly, no. 11 (Jul./Sep. 1962), pp. 116–123. .
 "The Communist Struggle for Power in Burma." World Today, vol. 20, no. 3 (Mar. 1964), pp. 105–112. .
 "The Struggle for the Third World." International Affairs, vol. 40, no. 3 (Jul. 1964), pp. 440–452. .
 "Latin America." Encounter (Feb. 1965).
 "The Study of Conflict." Institute for the Study of Conflict (1967).
 "The Conflict of Information: 'Detente', Freedom & Constraint," with Leonid Vladimirov. Conflict Studies (1975). Institute for the Study of Conflict. . .
 "Russia's Revolutionary Base." New Lugano Review, vol. 2, no. 8-12 (1976).
 "My Pilgrimage to Kent (Connecticut)." New Lugano Review, vol. 2, no. 11-12 (1976). pp. 8–24.
 "Pour une bribe d'empire." Revue des Deux Mondes (Apr. 1989), pp. 249–253. .
 "Creating 'A Lot on Her Hands,'" with Helen Gregory. Labour History, no. 85 (Nov. 2003), pp. 89–101. .

Reports
 The Ulster Debate: Report of a Study Group of the Institute for the Study of Conflict (1972), with James Camlin Beckett and Robert Moss. London: The Bodley Head for the Institute for the Study of Conflict. .

Book reviews
 Review of La Fin d'une guerre: Indochine 1954, by Jean Lacouture & Philippe Devillers. International Affairs, vol. 37, no. 2 (Apr. 1961), pp. 264–265. .
 Review of Indonesia: A Profile, by Jeane S. Mintz. Pacific Affairs, vol. 35, no. 2 (Summer 1962), pp. 184–185. .
 Review of The Story of Indonesia, by Louis Fischer; The Beginnings of the Indonesian-Dutch Negotiations and the Hoge Veluwe Talks, by Idrus Nasir Djajadiningrat. Pacific Affairs, vol. 35, no. 2 (Summer 1962), pp. 185–186. .

In the media
Crozier was interviewed for a 1999 film by Peter Graves for A&E Network's Biography series, Chiang Kai-shek: The Battle for China, including other contributors such as John Stewart Service.

He also appeared in The Mayfair Set, a 1999 four-part documentary series about the rise of business and the decline of political power, written and directed by Adam Curtis for BBC. He appeared in episode three, "Destroy the Technostructure," which Curtis described as "the story of how Sir James Goldsmith, through a series of corporate raids, became one of the world's richest men and a victim of his own success."

ReferencesBibliography'''
Bellamy, Chris (Aug. 13, 2012). "Brian Crozier: Intelligence and security expert who fought communism and founded his own spy network" (obituary). The Independent''. Archived from the original.

External links

 Brian Crozier papers at the Hoover Institution Archives

1918 births
2012 deaths

British foreign policy writers
British historians
The Economist people
Australian emigrants to the United Kingdom
Australian expatriates in France
Place of death missing
British anti-communists
Historians of Francoist Spain